The European Parliament election of 2019 took place in Italy on 26 May 2019.

In Aosta Valley Lega Nord came first with 37.2% of the vote (country-level result 34.3%) and more than 20pp than the Democratic Party, which came second with 16.2% of the vote. Autonomies for Europe, a five-party regional coalition including the Valdostan Union, came third with 13.9% of the vote, ahead of the Five Star Movement (9.7%), Forza Italia (5.4%), Green Europe (4.7%), More Europe (3.7%), Brothers of Italy (3.3%) and The Left (2.7%).

Results

References

Elections in Aosta Valley
European Parliament elections in Italy
2019 European Parliament election
2019 elections in Italy